Scotaeus corallipes is a species of darkling beetles in the family Tenebrionidae.

Distribution
This species can be found in Java, Borneo and Sumatra.

References

Tenebrionidae
Insects of Indonesia
Beetles described in 1834